The Last Temptation is the fourth studio album by American rapper Ja Rule. It was released by Murder Inc. and Def Jam. Originally scheduled for a 2003 release, the album was ultimately released on November 19, 2002.

This album contained singles such as "Thug Lovin'" (featuring Bobby Brown), "Mesmerize" (featuring Ashanti) and "The Pledge (Remix)" (by Ashanti featuring Nas, Ja Rule and 2Pac). "Murder Reigns" was also released as a single titled "Reign" in select territories outside of North America, such as Europe and Australasia. The song "Pop Niggas" gained some attention after it was reported to be talking in part about 50 Cent. Pharrell was featured in the song, but not credited. Other guests featured on the album include: Bobby Brown, Ashanti, Nas, Alexi, Charli Baltimore, 2Pac, Caddillac Tah, Celeste Scalone, Eastwood, Crooked I, Young Life & Chink Santana.

The album was successful, moving 237,000 units in its first week, but less than his previous Pain Is Love. On December 13, 2002 the album was certified Platinum. "Mesmerize" is ranked at #45 on Blender's list of the "50 Worst Songs Ever", but was the most successful single from the album, reaching number 2 on the US Billboard Hot 100 and number 12 on the UK Singles Chart. The album also received criticism from fans, saying that the album sounded too commercial, and that Ja Rule was selling out: in addition, many artists that Ja Rule was feuding with, such as Daz Dillinger, Eminem, 50 Cent, Dr. Dre, G-Unit, Obie Trice, D12, Busta Rhymes, and DMX said that Ja Rule was trying to be just like Tupac Shakur, which fueled the rivalries even more. Though neither its  debut nor lifetime sales ever matched those of Pain Is Love, The Last Temptation is Ja Rule's third highest-selling album to date.

Track listing
Credits adapted from the album's liner notes.

Sample credits
 "Thug Lovin'" – Interpolates portions of "Knocks Me Off My Feet" performed by Stevie Wonder
 "Mesmerize" – Interpolates portions of "Stop, Look, Listen (To Your Heart)" performed by Marvin Gaye and Diana Ross
 "The Pledge (Remix)" – Contains a sample and elements of "So Many Tears" performed by 2Pac
 "Murder Reigns" – Contains a sample of "Africa" performed by Toto
 "Last Temptation" – Contains a sample of "Funky Sensation" performed by Gwen McCrae
 "Murder Me" – Contains a sample of "Anniversary" performed by Tony! Toni! Toné!
 "Rock Star" – Contains a sample of "I Belong to You" performed by Lenny Kravitz
 "Destiny (Outro)" – Contains a sample of "Midnight Sunshine" performed by The Soul Children

Charts

Weekly charts

Year-end charts

Certifications

References

2002 albums
Ja Rule albums
Albums produced by Irv Gotti
Albums produced by the Neptunes
Albums produced by Cool & Dre
Def Jam Recordings albums